Frank Jude (November 11, 1884 – May 4, 1961) was an outfielder in Major League Baseball. He played for the Cincinnati Reds in 1906.

Background
Born in Libby, Minnesota on November 11, 1884, Frank Donald Jude had a European-American father and an Ojibwe mother. His Ojibwe name was Gay-Bay-Aush. He attended Carlisle Indian Industrial School, a Native American boarding school in Carlisle, Pennsylvania.

References

External links

1884 births
1961 deaths
Albany Senators players
Baseball players from Minnesota
Carlisle Indians baseball players
Carlisle (minor league baseball) players
Cincinnati Reds players
Columbus Senators players
Dubuque Dubs players
Lincoln Railsplitters players
Major League Baseball outfielders
Mobile Sea Gulls players
Native American sportspeople
New Rockford-Carrington Twins players
Ojibwe people
Ottumwa Cardinals players
Peoria Distillers players
Saskatoon Quakers (baseball) players
Syracuse Stars (minor league baseball) players
Toledo Mud Hens players
Valley City Hi-Liners players
Winnipeg Maroons (baseball) players